Johannes Naschberger (born 25 January 2000) is an Austrian professional footballer who plays as a midfielder for Tirol.

Career
Naschberger is a youth product of the academies of FC Wildschönau, Wacker Innsbruck, Liefering, Red Bull Salzburg, and AKA Tirol. He began his senior career with Wörgl in 2017. On 14 August 2020, he transferred to Tirol. On 19 August 2021, he extended his contract with Tirol until the summer of 2024.

References

External links
 
 OEFB Profile

2000 births
Living people
People from Lienz
Austrian footballers
SV Wörgl players
WSG Tirol players
SC Austria Lustenau players
Austrian Football Bundesliga players
Austrian Regionalliga players
Association football midfielders
Footballers from Tyrol (state)